NFL Street is an American football video game developed by EA Tiburon and published by Electronic Arts under the EA Sports BIG label. It was released for the PlayStation 2, GameCube and Xbox on January 13, 2004. Barry Sanders of the Detroit Lions, Shannon Sharpe of the Denver Broncos, and Ricky Williams of the Miami Dolphins appear on the cover. The game was followed by NFL Street 2 and NFL Street 3.

Gameplay
Similar to the Blitz series, Street is seven-on-seven American football, modeled roughly after its informal variant, street football. NFL Players in the game wear street clothing instead of helmets and uniforms (although the players can wear football jerseys). Like other American Football games, NFL Street has basic football rules, but the gameplay has no fouls and low penalty, naturally leading to much more aggressive gameplay than its real-life model. However, to maintain the "IronMan" status, there are no injuries in the game.

One important feature in the game is "style points", which the player can earn by successfully completing style moves (which includes making a huge play or taunting the other team during the game). Enough style points will earn the player a "Gamebreaker", which lasts for the entire drive. The Gamebreaker concept was taken from NBA Street.

An offensive Gamebreaker allows the player to plow through defenders and easily score a touchdown. On defense, it allows the player to easily get through their opponents blockers, cause fumbles, and possibly create a turnover. While difficult, it is possible to cancel a Gamebreaker by stopping your opponent from scoring. Additionally a Gamebreaker may be canceled if the player activates his while his opponent's is already activated. In this situation, both Gamebreakers are canceled. It is also possible to stop a defensive Gamebreaker by running out of bounds.

Game modes
Quick Game — In this mode you select a team and play a quick game against either the computer or a friend. The scoring system can be in touchdowns or style points, depending on the choice of the player.
Pickup Game —  A Pickup Game is the same as a Quick Game, but instead of choosing a team, you and your opponent create teams from a pool of around 40 NFL players, some of which are Legends. In game, the teams are referred as "Team One" and "Team Two". Regulation Pickup Games of NFL Street allow each team one redraft (also called a "Re") if one team believes the random assortment of players available in the draft are not up to par. However, if both teams have used their redraft, another redraft can be done if both teams dislike the draft. This is known in the NFL Street community as "Mutual Garb."
NFL Challenge — This is the main mode in the game. You create a team, from logo to players height, and go through a series of challenges against other teams, unlocking new football stadiums, teams, equipment, and development points for improving your team by completing several challenges that vary in their difficulty
All NFL Pickup — To unlock this mode, you must first beat the NFL Challenge mode. The same features apply as in Pickup Game, but instead of a 40 player pool, you can select from any of the players in the game, including Legends. You can choose 1-2 players from any team except from the cheat code teams.

Rosters
The rosters are based on the 2003 NFL roster, with some earlier players as NFL Legends.

Soundtrack
The original score was done by turntablist group The X-Ecutioners, along with several songs that were part of pre-album releases for other artists on the soundtrack. 
Baby D - "It's Goin Down" (Pre-album release)
Bravehearts featuring Nas, Lil Jon - "Quick to Back Down"
DJ Kay Slay presents Three 6 Mafia featuring Lil Wyte and Frayser Boy - "Who Gives A..." (Pre-album release)
Fuel - "Quarter"
Grafh - "I Don't Care" (Pre-album release)
Jakk Frost - "This Man" (Pre-album release)
Korn featuring Nas - "Play Me"
Killer Mike - "Rap Is Dead"
Lil' Flip - "What's My Name"
Lostprophets - "Last Train Home" (Pre-album release)
Wylde Bunch - "Our Life" (Pre-album release)
Wylde Bunch - "Harder" (Pre-album release)
The X-Ecutioners featuring Good Charlotte - "Let's Go"
X-ecutioners featuring B-Real - "Get With It" (Pre-album release)

Reception

By July 2006, the PlayStation 2 version of NFL Street had sold 950,000 copies and earned $37 million in the United States. Next Generation ranked it as the 58th highest-selling game launched for the PlayStation 2, Xbox or GameCube between January 2000 and July 2006 in that country. Combined console sales of NFL Street games released in the 2000s reached 2 million units in the United States by July 2006.

NFL Street received "favorable" reviews on all platforms according to video game review aggregator Metacritic. It received a runner-up position in GameSpots 2004 "Best Alternative Sports Game" award category across all platforms, losing to Mario Power Tennis.

Maxim gave the game all five stars and said the player can "dispense with kicking and doodle-heavy playbooks, and deploy between-the-leg laterals and double reverses, plus a mess of excellent unsportsmanlike, showboating taunts." The Village Voice gave the Xbox version a score of nine out of ten and said, "In the surprisingly good single-player "NFL Challenge" mode, you earn points to build a franchise, choosing everything from the players' mutated genes (10 attributes, plus size) to their speed-enhancing sneakers. 'Cause it ain't all about the steroids." However, Entertainment Weekly gave the game a B and said, "This pigskin sim fumbles by forcing players to run their amateur team against the pros in order to unlock better fields and additional players - a clear case of unnecessary roughness." The Cincinnati Enquirer gave it two-and-a-half stars out of five and called it "a fun, simplistic diversion, especially with a group of friends. However, once you've seen all the style moves it doesn't have the staying power of much deeper football games like EA's own Madden NFL 2004."

David Leonard of PopMatters critiqued the game's depiction of African-American men, comparing the "emphasis on savagery, violence and animalistic features" to those used in the controversial first-person shooter Ethnic Cleansing.

References

External links

2004 video games
EA Sports Big games
PlayStation 2 games
National Football League video games
Video games developed in the United States
GameCube games
Xbox games
Video games set in the United States